Kobaia is a community in Northern Province of Sierra Leone. It is located in the Koinadugu District.

References

Populated places in Sierra Leone
Northern Province, Sierra Leone